This article attempts to list the oldest buildings in the state of Texas in the United States of America, including the oldest houses in Texas and any other surviving structures, including those constructed during the Spanish colonization, before independence and statehood. Some dates are approximate and based on architectural studies and historical records, other dates are based on dendrochronology. All entries should include citation with reference to: period architectural features; a report by an architectural historian; or dendrochronology.  Sites on the list are generally from the earliest period architecture. Only buildings built prior to 1860 are suitable for inclusion on this list or the building must be the oldest of its type.

See also
National Register of Historic Places listings in Texas
Spanish missions in Texas
Oldest buildings in the United States

References 

Texas
Architecture in Texas
Oldest